Sophronica is a genus of longhorn beetles of the subfamily Lamiinae, containing the following species:

 Sophronica abyssinica Breuning, 1966
 Sophronica abyssiniensis Breuning, 1977
 Sophronica aeneipennis Breuning, 1963
 Sophronica alboapicalis Breuning, 1940
 Sophronica albohirta Breuning, 1961
 Sophronica albomaculata Breuning, 1970
 Sophronica albomaculosa Téocchi, 1986
 Sophronica albomarmorata Breuning, 1955
 Sophronica albopicta Breuning, 1940
 Sophronica albopunctata Breuning, 1949
 Sophronica albostictica Breuning, 1942
 Sophronica albostictipennis Breuning, 1959
 Sophronica allardi Breuning, 1974
 Sophronica amplipennis Pascoe, 1888
 Sophronica angusticollis Aurivillius, 1928
 Sophronica antenigra Breuning, 1981
 Sophronica antennalis Breuning, 1940
 Sophronica anteochracea Breuning, 1966
 Sophronica apicalis Pic, 1922
 Sophronica apicefusca Báguena & Breuning, 1958
 Sophronica apicemarmorata Breuning, 1954
 Sophronica apicenigra Báguena & Breuning, 1958
 Sophronica apimaculata Breuning, 1986
 Sophronica arabica Breuning, 1962
 Sophronica asmarensis Breuning, 1954
 Sophronica assamensis Breuning, 1966
 Sophronica atripennis (Pic, 1926)
 Sophronica aureicollis Breuning, 1956
 Sophronica aureovittata Aurivillius, 1907
 Sophronica aurescens Breuning, 1968
 Sophronica bambusae Teocchi, Sudre & Jiroux, 2010
 Sophronica basigranulata Breuning, 1940
 Sophronica benitoensis Báguena & Breuning, 1958
 Sophronica benjamini Breuning, 1966
 Sophronica bettoni Gahan, 1898
 Sophronica bicolor Báguena & Breuning, 1958
 Sophronica bicoloricornis Pic, 1944
 Sophronica bicoloripes (Pic, 1928)
 Sophronica bifoveata Aurivillius, 1914
 Sophronica bifuscomaculata Breuning, 1952
 Sophronica bimaculipennis (Breuning, 1955)
 Sophronica binigromaculipennis Breuning, 1963
 Sophronica binigrovittipennis Breuning, 1964
 Sophronica bipuncticollis Breuning, 1959
 Sophronica bituberculata Breuning, 1959
 Sophronica bituberosa Breuning, 1952
 Sophronica bowringi (Gressitt, 1939)
 Sophronica breuningi Pic, 1944
 Sophronica brunnea (Fisher, 1940)
 Sophronica brunnescens Breuning, 1969
 Sophronica calceata Chevrolat, 1855
 Sophronica calceoides Lepesme & Breuning, 1952
 Sophronica camerunica Breuning, 1959
 Sophronica cantaloubei Breuning, 1958
 Sophronica carbonaria Pascoe, 1864
 Sophronica carissae (Fisher, 1930)
 Sophronica cephalotes Breuning, 1940
 Sophronica ceylanica Breuning, 1971
 Sophronica chinensis Breuning, 1940
 Sophronica cinerascens Breuning, 1940
 Sophronica coeruleipennis Breuning, 1940
 Sophronica collarti Breuning, 1948
 Sophronica conradti Aurivillius, 1907
 Sophronica costipennis Breuning, 1940
 Sophronica costulata (Quedenfeldt, 1882)
 Sophronica crampeli Pic, 1944
 Sophronica cuprea Breuning, 1954
 Sophronica cylindricollis Breuning, 1954
 Sophronica debeckeri Breuning, 1975
 Sophronica delamarei Lepesme & Breuning, 1951
 Sophronica densepunctata Breuning, 1977
 Sophronica disconigra Breuning, 1958
 Sophronica diversepunctata Breuning, 1956
 Sophronica diversipes (Pic, 1929)
 Sophronica dorsovittata Breuning, 1940
 Sophronica egenus Holzschuh, 2006
 Sophronica elongatissima Breuning, 1942
 Sophronica exigua Aurivillius, 1907
 Sophronica exocentroides Breuning & Téocchi, 1973
 Sophronica fallaciosa Breuning, 1939
 Sophronica favareli Pic, 1944
 Sophronica feai Breuning, 1943
 Sophronica fimbriata Breuning, 1940
 Sophronica flava Breuning, 1942
 Sophronica flavescens Breuning, 1981
 Sophronica flavipennis Breuning, 1952
 Sophronica flavofemorata Breuning, 1956
 Sophronica flavoides Breuning, 1961
 Sophronica flavomaculata Breuning, 1964
 Sophronica flavostictica (Breuning, 1954)
 Sophronica flavovittata Breuning, 1981
 Sophronica forticornis Breuning, 1975
 Sophronica fulvicollis Gahan, 1904
 Sophronica funebris Breuning, 1954
 Sophronica fusca Kolbe, 1893
 Sophronica fuscifrons Breuning, 1969
 Sophronica fuscipennis Breuning, 1969
 Sophronica fuscoapicalis Breuning, 1955
 Sophronica fuscodiscalis Breuning, 1969
 Sophronica fuscofasciata Lepesme & Breuning, 1956
 Sophronica fuscolateralis Breuning, 1940
 Sophronica fuscoscapa Breuning, 1953
 Sophronica fuscovittata Breuning, 1958
 Sophronica gracilior Breuning, 1940
 Sophronica gracilis Breuning, 1940
 Sophronica gracillima Breuning, 1943
 Sophronica granulosipennis Breuning, 1968
 Sophronica grisea Aurivillius, 1908
 Sophronica griseoides Breuning, 1986
 Sophronica griseomarmorata Breuning, 1966
 Sophronica grossepunctata Breuning, 1940
 Sophronica grossepuncticollis Breuning, 1961
 Sophronica grossepunctipennis Breuning, 1973
 Sophronica hirsuta (Pascoe, 1864)
 Sophronica hirsutula Breuning, 1954 
 Sophronica hologrisea Breuning, 1978
 Sophronica humeralis Breuning, 1940
 Sophronica ikuthensis Breuning, 1966
 Sophronica improba Pascoe,
 Sophronica indica Breuning, 1940
 Sophronica infrafusca Breuning, 1950
 Sophronica infrarufa Breuning, 1961
 Sophronica intricata Aurivillius, 1928
 Sophronica junodi Breuning, 1950
 Sophronica kaszabi Breuning, 1972
 Sophronica kivuensis Breuning, 1940
 Sophronica kochi Breuning, 1981
 Sophronica koreana Gressitt, 1951
 Sophronica laterifusca Breuning, 1939
 Sophronica laterifuscipennis Breuning, 1959
 Sophronica latior Breuning, 1986
 Sophronica leonensis Breuning, 1940
 Sophronica lineata Pascoe, 1858
 Sophronica longeantennata Breuning, 1940
 Sophronica longiliscapus Breuning, 1968
 Sophronica longiscapus Breuning, 1943
 Sophronica machadoi Lepesme, 1953
 Sophronica maculosa Pic, 1944
 Sophronica madagascariensis Breuning, 1940
 Sophronica madecassa Breuning, 1957  
 Sophronica major Breuning, 1940
 Sophronica mauretanica Breuning, 1942
 Sophronica mediorufoantennata Breuning, 1968
 Sophronica microphthalma Breuning, 1940
 Sophronica minuta Kolbe, 1893
 Sophronica mirei Breuning & Villiers, 1960
 Sophronica moheliana Breuning, 1957
 Sophronica musae Hintz, 1919
 Sophronica nguruensis Breuning, 1964
 Sophronica nigriceps Breuning, 1940 
 Sophronica nigricollis Breuning, 1940
 Sophronica nigricornis Breuning, 1943
 Sophronica nigritarsis Báguena & Breuning, 1958
 Sophronica nigriticollis Breuning, 1949
 Sophronica nigritula Breuning, 1940
 Sophronica nigroapicalis Breuning, 1940
 Sophronica nigrobivitta Breuning, 1940
 Sophronica nigromaculipennis Breuning, 1968
 Sophronica nigrosetosa Breuning, 1940
 Sophronica nigrosternalis Breuning, 1954
 Sophronica nigrosuturalis Breuning, 1939
 Sophronica nigrovittata Breuning, 1982
 Sophronica nitida Aurivillius, 1907
 Sophronica obrioides Bates, 1873
 Sophronica ochreiceps Breuning, 1951  
 Sophronica ochreicollis Breuning, 1966
 Sophronica ochreofemorata Breuning, 1969
 Sophronica ochreoscutellaris Breuning, 1940
 Sophronica ochreovertex Breuning, 1967
 Sophronica ochreovitticollis Breuning, 1951
 Sophronica olivacea Báguena & Breuning, 1958
 Sophronica paracamerunica Breuning, 1977
 Sophronica parallela Breuning, 1954
 Sophronica parterufoantennalis Breuning, 1968
 Sophronica paupercula Holzschuh, 2006
 Sophronica persimilis Breuning, 1940
 Sophronica pienaari Distant, 1898
 Sophronica postscutellaris Breuning, 1954
 Sophronica pretiosa Breuning, 1959
 Sophronica pseudintricata Breuning, 1940
 Sophronica pulchra Breuning, 1954
 Sophronica punctatostriata Breuning, 1948
 Sophronica pusilloides Breuning, 1977
 Sophronica raffrayi Breuning, 1970
 Sophronica reducta Pascoe, 1888
 Sophronica renaudi Breuning, 1961
 Sophronica rhodesiana Breuning, 1953
 Sophronica richardmolardi Lepesme & Breuning, 1952
 Sophronica rubida Breuning, 1940
 Sophronica rubroscapa Hunt & Breuning, 1966
 Sophronica rufescens (Pic, 1926)
 Sophronica ruficeps Breuning, 1940
 Sophronica rufina Breuning, 1981
 Sophronica rufiniceps Breuning, 1949
 Sophronica rufipennis Aurivillius, 1926
 Sophronica rufiscape Breuning, 1981
 Sophronica rufobasalis Breuning, 1940
 Sophronica rufobasiantennalis Breuning, 1948
 Sophronica rufofemoralis Breuning, 1969
 Sophronica rufofemorata Breuning, 1954
 Sophronica rufohumeralis Breuning, 1981
 Sophronica rufooccipitalis Breuning, 1966
 Sophronica rufoscapa Aurivillius, 1907
 Sophronica rufosuturalis Breuning, 1954
 Sophronica rufotibialis Breuning, 1954
 Sophronica rufula Breuning, 1940
 Sophronica rufulescens Breuning, 1940
 Sophronica rufuloides Lepesme & Breuning, 1951
 Sophronica ruwenzorii Breuning, 1966
 Sophronica sansibarica Breuning, 1939
 Sophronica schrepferi Breuning, 1964
 Sophronica scotti Breuning, 1940
 Sophronica sericans Breuning, 1940
 Sophronica setosa Breuning, 1940
 Sophronica somaliensis Breuning, 1943
 Sophronica sparsepilosa Pic, 1944
 Sophronica spinipennis Breuning, 1940
 Sophronica strandi Breuning, 1940
 Sophronica striatopunctata Hunt & Breuning, 1957
 Sophronica subaureicollis Breuning, 1967
 Sophronica subaureovittata Breuning, 1977
 Sophronica subcamerunica Breuning, 1969
 Sophronica subcarissae Breuning, 1968
 Sophronica subcephalotes Breuning, 1954
 Sophronica subdivisa Breuning, 1940 
 Sophronica subfuscoapicalis Breuning, 1952
 Sophronica subfuscoscapa Breuning, 1964
 Sophronica subgrossepuncticollis Breuning, 1972
 Sophronica subhumeralis Breuning, 1958
 Sophronica subimproba Breuning, 1981   
 Sophronica subparallela Breuning, 1970
 Sophronica subproba Breuning, 1959
 Sophronica substriatipennis Hunt & Breuning, 1957
 Sophronica subternigra Breuning, 1986
 Sophronica sudanica Breuning, 1962
 Sophronica sundukovi Danilevsky, 2009
 Sophronica suturalis Aurivillius, 1924
 Sophronica suturella Breuning, 1940
 Sophronica suturevittata Breuning, 1954
 Sophronica tafoensis Breuning, 1978
 Sophronica talhouki Holzschuh & Téocchi, 1991
 Sophronica taverniersi Breuning, 1973
 Sophronica testacea Gahan, 1898
 Sophronica tonkinensis Breuning, 1975
 Sophronica trifuscoplagiata Breuning, 1954
 Sophronica undulata Breuning, 1943
 Sophronica uninigromaculipennis Breuning, 1968
 Sophronica variantennata Breuning,
 Sophronica ventralis Aurivillius, 1925
 Sophronica venzoi Breuning, 1940
 Sophronica villiersi Breuning, 1948
 Sophronica vitticollis Breuning, 1981
 Sophronica vittipennis Breuning, 1966
 Sophronica wittmeri Holzschuh, 1992

References

 
Desmiphorini